Viburnum setigerum, the tea viburnum, is a plant in the family Adoxaceae that is native to China.

Description
Viburnum setigerum is a shrub with opposite, simple leaves, and flexible, arching stems. The flowers are white, borne in spring. Drupes ripen to red in the fall.

References

setigerum
Plants described in 1882
Flora of China